This is a list of films produced in the Netherlands during the 2000s. The films are produced in the Dutch language.

2000

2001

2002

2003

2004

2005

2006

2007

2008

2009

References

2000s
Films
Dutch